Gene Kelly (born Eugene Sims) (October 6, 1918 – September 18, 1979) was an American sportscaster, best known as the announcer for the Philadelphia Phillies during the 1950s.

Early life 
Kelly was born Eugene K. Sims in Brooklyn, New York on October 6, 1918.
He attended Marshall University, graduating in 1941. After graduating Kelly signed a Class C contract with the Brooklyn Dodgers, but arm trouble prevented him from continuing as a player. During World War II, he served in the U.S. Army Air Corps.

Career 
Originally, By Saam was the broadcaster for both Philadelphia A's and Philadelphia Phillies games, which was possible because only home games were broadcast live, and the A's and Phillies shared Shibe Park, therefore were never home at the same time. When the announcers began to travel with the teams to road games, a second announcer was needed for the 1950 season. Saam chose to stay with the A's, and Kelly, who had previously been general manager of WXLW in Indianapolis, became the Phillies broadcaster. Over the next decade, his broadcast partners included Claude Haring, Bill Brundige and George Walsh

The Phillies fired Kelly after the 1959 season. He then moved to Cincinnati to broadcast Cincinnati Reds games beginning in 1960. At times during his career he was a football announcer for the St. Louis Cardinals, Big Ten, Notre Dame and Ivy League, as well as announcing the Indianapolis 500 and Philadelphia Warriors basketball games.

Death 
Kelly had a stroke at his home in Merion, Pennsylvania and passed away on September 18, 1979.

References

External links 
 

1918 births
1979 deaths
American sports announcers
Major League Baseball broadcasters
Marshall University alumni
Philadelphia Phillies announcers